The 2018 Asian Formula Renault Series (aka AFR Series) is the 19th season of the AFR Series since its creation in 2000 by FRD. The season will begin on 17 March at the Zhuhai International Circuit and will end after six double-header events.

Starting from 2015, drivers and teams compete in two classes, Pro (Class A) for drivers and teams competing with the 2013 FR2.0 car, and Elite (Class B) for drivers and teams using the FR2.0 old spec cars.

As part of an enhanced agreement with Renault Sport, the season will feature a scholarship program for young Chinese drivers, called Road to Champion. The winner among these drivers over the last three rounds of the championship will secure a link to race the following year in Europe with the help of Renault Sport.

By virtue of a 67 point lead in the 2018 Team Championship at the conclusion of Race Two in Sepang on August 26, BlackArts Racing Team won the Team Championship for the 4th consecutive year in the Asia Formula Renault Series, with one round remaining.

Teams and drivers

Race calendar and results

The calendar for the 2018 season was published on 9 November 2017.

Championship standings

Points system

Points are awarded to the top 14 classified finishers. Drivers in Pro and Elite classes are classified separately.

Drivers' Championships

References

External links
 

Formula Renault seasons
2018 in Chinese motorsport
Asian Formula Renault